Croatia competed at the 2010 Summer Youth Olympics in Singapore.

The Croatian squad consisted of 25 athletes competing in 12 sports: aquatics (swimming), athletics, basketball, canoeing, gymnastics, judo, rowing, shooting, table tennis, taekwondo, tennis, and triathlon.

Medalists

Athletics

Boys
Field Events

Girls
Track and Road Events

Field Events

Basketball

Boys

Canoeing

Boys

Gymnastics

Artistic Gymnastics

Boys

Judo

Individual

Team

Rowing

Shooting

Pistol

Rifle

Swimming

Table tennis

Individual

Team

Taekwondo

Tennis

Singles

Doubles

Triathlon

Girls

Mixed

References

External links

Competitors List: Croatia

Nations at the 2010 Summer Youth Olympics
2010 in Croatian sport
Croatia at the Youth Olympics